The 2004 All Japan Grand Touring Car Championship was the twelfth season of Japan Automobile Federation GT premiere racing and the final season under the name All Japan Grand Touring Car Championship as for 2005 the series was renamed to Super GT. It was marked as well as the twenty-second season of a JAF-sanctioned sports car racing championship dating back to the All Japan Sports Prototype Championship. The GT500 class champions of 2004 were the #1 Xanavi NISMO Nissan Fairlady Z team driven by Satoshi Motoyama and Richard Lyons and the GT300 class champions were the #16 M-TEC Honda NSX driven by Tetsuya Yamano and Hiroyuki Yagi.

Drivers and teams

GT500

Schedule

Season results

Standings

GT500 class

Drivers' standings
Scoring system

There were no points awarded for pole position and fastest lap in the final race.

Teams' standings
For teams that entered multiple cars, only the best result from each round counted towards the teams' championship.

GT300 class (Top 5)

Drivers

References

External links
 Super GT/JGTC official race archive 
 2004 season results

Super GT seasons
JGTC